Linda Gleeson was a female English international table tennis player.

She won a silver medal at the 1926 World Table Tennis Championships in the mixed doubles with Roland Jacobi.

See also
 List of table tennis players
 List of World Table Tennis Championships medalists

References

English female table tennis players
World Table Tennis Championships medalists